Killing Floor may refer to:

Music
 “Hard Times Killing Floor Blues” (Skip James song), 1931
 "Killing Floor" (Howlin' Wolf song), 1964
 "Killing Floor", a song on Bruce Dickinson's 1998 album The Chemical Wedding
 "Killin' Floor", a song on Body Count's 1992 album Body Count
 "Killing Floor", a song on Black Stone Cherry's 2011 album Between the Devil & the Deep Blue Sea
 "Killing Floor", a song on Redgum's 1978 album If You Don't Fight You Lose
 Killing Floor, an album by Vigilantes of Love
 Killing Floor (British band), a British blues rock band
 Killing Floor (American band), an American electro-industrial group
 Killing Floor (album), 1995

Literature
 Killing Floor, a novel by Lee Child
 Killing Floor, a poetry collection by Ai

Films 
 The Killing Floor (1984 film), a 1984 film by director Bill Duke
 The Killing Floor (2007 film), a 2007 thriller film by director Gideon Raff

Other media
 Killing Floor (video game), a 2009 video game developed by Tripwire Studios based on an Unreal Tournament modification of the same name
 Killing Floor 2, 2016 sequel

See also
 Slaughterhouse